Jimmy Neutron is a Nickelodeon computer-animated media franchise created by John A. Davis in the 1980s and commenced in 1998 with the pilot Runaway Rocketboy. The franchise focuses on the titular Jimmy Neutron (voiced by Debi Derryberry), a young boy with a genius-level intellect.

Films

Jimmy Neutron: Boy Genius

After the pilot was completed, Nickelodeon executives, who were impressed by the pilot and still enthusiastic about the show's potential, raised the prospect of creating a theatrical film to accompany the TV series, much to the surprise of Davis and his team at the studio. During the initial pitch to Nickelodeon, Oedekerk had highlighted the idea that using computer animation would allow the same models and assets to be reused between both a film and a TV show, an idea which Nick held a strong faith in. Davis further suggested that the feature film be created first, since the characters being modeled could be created at a higher quality than they would have with a TV budget. Although Nick was worried that it would be more difficult to attract a movie-going audience without the TV show to build an install base for the series, these concerns were answered with a series of short TV interstitials which would begin airing in order to build up hype for the upcoming film. The film was a box office and critical success and was nominated for the first Academy Award for Best Animated Feature at the 74th Academy Awards along with Pixar's Monsters, Inc. but lost to DreamWorks Animation’s Shrek.

Cancelled sequel
In February 2002, a sequel was reported in development for a summer 2004 release. Producer Albie Hecht reported to The Los Angeles Times that the sequel "would be made on the same budget as the first, but with a new batch of inventions and adventures in Jimmy's town of Retroville." On June 20, 2002, The Hollywood Reporter reported that writer Kate Boutilier had signed a writing deal with Nickelodeon Movies and Paramount Pictures to write a sequel to the film, but the sequel never materialized. The film was cancelled because the writers could not agree on a story and Alcorn later stated in an interview that "once the TV series came out, there wasn't a lot of incentive to make a movie when fans could simply watch Jimmy Neutron for free at home."

Possible reboot
In 2016, director John A. Davis stated that he has a story for a Jimmy Neutron reboot feature that he would like to make, but he is waiting for the "right situation" to make it.

When asked about a reboot in 2020, Rob Paulsen stated "Well, I've got to tell you, man. I go all over the world when we don't have the coronavirus, and people love Carl. They love Carl. I don't think it would be a bad thing at all to reboot Jimmy Neutron. I think that's one of those shows that a lot of people would love to see again. It was very good. Really smart. That wouldn't surprise me."

Television series
 The Adventures of Jimmy Neutron, Boy Genius (the first series): Throughout the show, various mishaps and conflicts occur on these adventures, as Jimmy's various inventions go awry. The series was well-received. DNA Productions retooled their pipeline when moving from the film to the TV series, to reuse assets for the episodes. Some of the programming team at the studio programmed a special code that allowed the animators to animate scenes in Maya, which can then be rendered in Lightwave. This helped the team keep up with the deadline and avoid going over budget.

 Planet Sheen (the second series) was a spin-off focusing on Sheen. Originally designed as a series called Red Acres, it was unrelated to Jimmy Neutron, but after multiple network rejections, including Cartoon Network and Disney Channel, the series was re-developed the series to what would become Planet Sheen. The series was not well received by fans, but critics had mixed reviews.

Specials

The Jimmy Timmy Power Hour is a trilogy of television crossover specials set between the universes of the animated television series The Fairly OddParents and The Adventures of Jimmy Neutron, Boy Genius. The saga consists of The Jimmy Timmy Power Hour, The Jimmy Timmy Power Hour 2: When Nerds Collide, and The Jimmy Timmy Power Hour 3: The Jerkinators, which premiered on Nickelodeon between 2004 and 2006, and were subsequently released to home video. The specials combine multiple types of animation, using traditional 2D animation for the segments set in the Fairly OddParents universe and CGI for the Jimmy Neutron segments.

Video games
 Jimmy Neutron: Boy Genius – The first game was based on the film.
 Jimmy Neutron vs. Jimmy Negatron – Jimmy meets Jimmy Negatron is an evil version of Neutron from another dimension. Negatron plans on taking over Retroville and Jimmy must stop him.
 The Adventures of Jimmy Neutron Boy Genius: Jet Fusion – Based on the TV movie of the same name.
 The Adventures of Jimmy Neutron Boy Genius: Attack of the Twonkies – Based on the episode of the same name.

Shorts
Runaway Rocket Boy, premiered in autumn 1998, during these shorts he was called Johnny Quasar.
Film Promotion Shorts, a number of shorts were produced many of the inventtoons were released during 1999 - 2000.

Cast

Rides and attractions
 Jimmy Neutron's Nicktoon Blast, a simulator ride at Universal Studios Florida
 Jimmy Neutron's Atomic Flyer, a steel suspended family roller coaster at Movie Park Germany

References

franchise
1980s establishments
Paramount Global franchises